Barbara Helene Barrington (9 May 1923 – 24 May 2010) better known by her stage and birth maiden name Barbara New was an English character actress, well known for playing Mabel the scullery maid in the David Croft sitcom You Rang M'Lord?. Following this role, she appeared as Vera Plumtree in all twenty episodes of the BBC's final David Croft sitcom Oh, Doctor Beeching!. She had previously played smaller parts in Croft's sitcoms Dad's Army and Hi-de-Hi!.

New had a lengthy acting career, mainly in British television and played many other roles including appearances in Z-Cars, Emu's Broadcasting Company, Ripping Yarns and the silent Ronnie Barker comedy By the Sea. One of her last screen appearances was as Ali G's Nan in the 2002 film Ali G Indahouse.

New also appeared in television adverts for Vicks over a twenty-year period, initially as a mother and later as a grandmother.

She was married to the actor Michael Barrington until his death in 1988.

Film and television roles

References

External links
 

English television actresses
1923 births
2010 deaths
People from Hammersmith
Actresses from London
English film actresses
20th-century English actresses
21st-century English actresses